Maxwell Frederick Riddles Hemmings (born 27 February 1997) is an English footballer who last played as a midfielder for League of Ireland First Division side Galway United.

Career

College 
In 2015, Hemmings joined Georgia State University's men's soccer team who compete in the NCAA Division 1 Sunbelt Conference. Hemmings started in 71 out of 74 games for the Panthers receiving multiple honors, including First Team All-Conference and All-Tournament Team when Georgia State won both the conference regular season and tournament in 2018. Captaining the side in his final year, Hemmings was the talisman for the Panthers. Hemmings finished his Georgia State career with 19 goals and 10 assists from center midfield.

Max Hemmings was part of a select few players across the country to be in the January 2019 MLS Super Draft List.

Professional 
Max Hemmings signed his first professional contract in April 2019 with USL League One side Greenville Triumph. 

On 20 February 2022, Hemmings signed for League of Ireland First Division side Galway United ahead of their upcoming 2022 season.

References

External links
 
 Profile at Georgia State Athletics

1997 births
Living people
English footballers
English expatriate footballers
English expatriate sportspeople in the United States
Georgia State Panthers men's soccer players
Memphis City FC players
Ocean City Nor'easters players
Greenville Triumph SC players
Galway United F.C. players
USL League One players
USL League Two players
Association football midfielders